I'm the Man may refer to:
 I'm the Man (EP), a 1987 EP by Anthrax
 I'm the Man (album), a 1979 album by Joe Jackson
 "I'm the Man" (Joe Jackson song), 1979
 "I'm the Man" (50 Cent song), 2015

See also
The Man (disambiguation)